Minutes to Midnight is the third studio album by American rock band Linkin Park, released on May 14, 2007, through Warner Bros. Records. The album was produced by Mike Shinoda and Rick Rubin, and it is Linkin Park's first studio album produced without Don Gilmore, who had produced the band's two previous albums. Minutes to Midnight is the band's follow-up album to Meteora (2003), and features a shift in the group's musical direction. For the band, the album marked a beginning of deviation from their signature nu metal sound. Minutes to Midnight takes its title from the Doomsday Clock symbol. It is also the band's first full-length album to carry a Parental Advisory label.

Linkin Park started working on their third studio album in 2003, taking a break to tour in support of Meteora in 2004. In this time period, the band formed numerous side projects; Mike Shinoda formed his hip hop side project Fort Minor, while Chester Bennington formed Dead by Sunrise, both of which caused the album to be shelved temporarily. The band returned to work on the record afterward, taking on a different musical direction than the 2003 sessions while working with producer Rick Rubin. The album's completion was delayed several times for unknown reasons. Eventually, "What I've Done" was chosen as the album's lead single in April 2007, with the album seeing release in North America on May 15, 2007.

The album debuted at number one in the US Billboard 200 and in 15 other countries, including the United Kingdom and Canada. In the United States, the album had the biggest first week sales of 2007 at the time, with 623,000 albums sold, going on to be certified five times platinum in the US. It was also certified double platinum in New Zealand, Italy, Ireland, and Australia and certified platinum in Canada, France, Switzerland and in the UK. It has sold more than four million copies in the US. It was ranked number 154 on Billboards Hot 200 Albums of the Decade. Despite its commercial success, Minutes to Midnight received mixed reviews from critics. Rolling Stone magazine, however, named it the twenty-fifth best album of 2007.

Background
In an interview, lead singer Chester Bennington explained that the album is "a mix of punk, classic rock, and hip-hop standards" and that "Rick has brought more of a stripped down, classic-rock and hip-hop kind of feel."

In another interview, Bennington stated: "This time around, Mike Shinoda is singing a lot more. It may seem like he's not on the record, but he's doing a lot of the harmonies. He also sings a couple of songs alone. We're presenting ourselves in a different way."

Recording and composition

Guitarist Brad Delson experimented with an EBow when the band was piecing together "The Little Things Give You Away". The band decided not to use the effect for the solo in that song and instead ended up creating "No More Sorrow" out of the effect. In "Given Up", he jingles the keys that are heard while several clap sounds are overlaid in the intro of the song (as mentioned in the lyric book: Brad added the sounds on the intro song: multiple tracks of claps - and keys jingling.). Shinoda and Delson teamed up with David Campbell to add string elements to six songs; "Leave Out All the Rest", "Shadow of the Day", "Hands Held High", "The Little Things Give You Away", as well as the two b-sides "No Roads Left" and "Blackbirds" (which was instead later used in the iPhone game 8-Bit Rebellion! as well as being included as a bonus track for A Thousand Suns), respectively. All scratching elements by Joe Hahn that existed in the previous two studio albums are largely absent because of the low mixing, except on the songs "What I've Done", "Wake", "The Little Things Give You Away", "Valentine's Day" and "In Pieces". Hahn contributes more with programming, electronics, and other elements to many of the songs. The church organ and military drumbeat on "Hands Held High" were originally to be used as the backdrop to melodic vocals, but Rubin recommended that the band try the opposite approach according to the album booklet. For the album, the band recorded fifty to sixty songs in August 2006. Their previous albums took only about three to six months to complete, while this one took 14 months. They spent over six months writing the songs. In previous albums, they composed an average of 40 songs, but they made over 100 this time.  "Shadow of the Day" is one of two songs (the other being "No Roads Left") to have Bennington playing the guitar. During live performances, Shinoda is generally playing the keyboard for "Shadow of the Day", while Bennington plays rhythm guitar. Shinoda stated in an interview: "We were looking back at the things that we had done in the past... and I think we just figured that we had exhausted that sound. It was easy for us to replicate, it was easy for other bands to replicate, and we just needed to move on."

Shinoda performs his rapping vocals on only two tracks, "Bleed It Out" and "Hands Held High". This is a significant decrease compared to the amount of rapping on previous albums. The rap vocals on "Hands Held High" are much closer styled to Mike Shinoda's side project Fort Minor than his traditional Linkin Park verses, as he raps during most of the song. Despite a decrease of Mike Shinoda as rapper, he has three solo lead songs on the record: "Hands Held High", "In Between" and the bonus track "No Roads Left". He also raps on "Bleed It Out" while "What I've Done", "Shadow of the Day", "No More Sorrow" and "The Little Things Give You Away" features backing vocals from Shinoda at the end. Minutes to Midnight is also Linkin Park's first album to feature guitar solos, particularly in the tracks "What I've Done," "In Pieces" and "The Little Things Give You Away". Also, unlike the previous two studio albums, Minutes to Midnight contains profanity and thus the first Linkin Park studio album to contain a Parental Advisory (the first overall being their collaborative EP with Jay-Z, Collision Course) and politically charged lyrics. The songs that contain profanity are "Given Up", "Bleed It Out" and "Hands Held High". Genre-wise, the album has been described as alternative rock and alternative metal.

Cover artwork 

The front and back cover were recorded around the ruins of North Shore Beach and Yacht Club in North Shore, California.
A year after the release of Minutes to Midnight, the band released ten different covers that were originally used as consideration for the final cover for the album prior to its release. The band made all ten of these covers available for fans to use as the album art on iTunes.

Critical reception

Minutes to Midnight received generally mixed to positive reviews, based on an aggregate score of 56/100 from Metacritic, with critics showing varying approval, disapproval and indifferent reactions.

Rolling Stone gave Minutes to Midnight 4 out of 5 stars, stating that "most of Minutes is honed, metallic pop with a hip hop stride and a wake-up kick", and it was placed at number 25 in their list of the Top 50 Albums of 2007. IGN referred to it as "definitely a step in the right direction and a stepping stone for things to come". Herald Sun writer Karen Tye gave it 3½ out of 4 stars and praised the band's new sound, asking, "Who knew being a plain old rock band could suit Linkin Park so well?". Despite commending the band for their ambition, The Guardians Caroline Sullivan gave the album 3 out of 5 stars and perceived "their decision to stay roughly within the shrieky boundaries of their genre" as a weakness, while writing that "the sound still pivots on the interplay of walloping guitar chords and self-flagellating lyrics".

Among those with a more negative view of the album was Stephen Thomas Erlewine of AllMusic, who described the album's sound as "passé" and summed the band's effort up as "opting to create a muddled, colorless murk", giving it 3 and a half out of 5 stars. Johan Wippsson from Melodic acknowledged the band's progression but felt that the album is "weak" and "too shattered".  NME magazine's Dan Silver gave it a rating of 2/10, calling it the "sound of a band trying and failing to forge a new identity", and referring to the song "Hands Held High", a song about terrorist attacks and war, as "far and away the funniest thing you will hear all year".

Commercial performance
Minutes to Midnight was delayed several times before its release. First scheduled to be released in the summer of 2006, it was later postponed to the fall of 2006, then again to early 2007. The album's release date was finally set for May 14, 2007. In Canada, the album was released on May 15, 2007. There are non-Parental Advisory releases of both the regular album and the special edition album. The songs "Given Up", "Bleed It Out", and "Hands Held High" are edited. In Malaysia, the edited version for the album is available in digipak cover while the explicit edition available for the Tour Edition which features white slipcase cardboard cover and a standard jewel case. In the United States, the album had the biggest first week sales of 2007 at the time, with 623,000 albums sold. In Canada, the album sold over 50,000 copies in its first week and debuted at number one on the Canadian Albums Chart. Worldwide, the album shipped over 3.3 million copies in its first four weeks of release.

Five singles were released from the album: "What I've Done", "Bleed It Out", "Shadow of the Day", "Given Up", and "Leave Out All the Rest". Although "Given Up" and "Leave Out All the Rest" had not been released as singles until early March 2008, "Given Up" had already charted on the Billboard Hot 100 and Billboard Pop 100 charts at numbers 99 and 78 respectively in 2007, and "Leave Out All the Rest" had already charted on Billboard's Pop 100 chart at number 98 and Billboard's Bubbling Under Hot 100 Singles chart at number 17 in 2007. The songs "Hands Held High" and "No More Sorrow" also charted on the Bubbling Under Hot 100 Singles chart at numbers 23 and 24, respectively, in 2007. The album has sold 3.3 million copies sold in the US alone.
Although sales of the album were lower than their two first studio albums, the album was more successful in terms of single's charting performance, with all of the five singles released reaching the Billboard Hot 100, and two songs reaching the Bubbling Under Hot 100.

Track listing

Minutes to Midnight – Live Around the World 

Minutes to Midnight – Live Around the World is a live album which features live versions of songs from the third studio album, Minutes to Midnight. They were recorded in various cities around the world from 2007 to 2010.

Track listing

Personnel

Credits adapted for AllMusic.

Linkin Park
 Chester Bennington – lead vocals; rhythm guitar on "Shadow of the Day" and "No Roads Left", backing vocals on "Hands Held High" and "In Between"
 Rob Bourdon – drums, percussion, backing vocals on "Hands Held High"
 Brad Delson – lead guitar; string arrangements on "Leave Out All the Rest", "Shadow of the Day", "Hands Held High", "The Little Things Give You Away", and "No Roads Left", keyboard and backing vocals on "Hands Held High"
 Dave "Phoenix" Farrell – bass guitar; backing vocals on "The Little Things Give You Away"  and "Hands Held High"
 Joe Hahn – turntables, sampling, programming,  backing vocals on "Hands Held High"
 Mike Shinoda – rhythm guitar, keyboard, piano, production; string arrangements on "Leave Out All the Rest", "Shadow of the Day", "Hands Held High", "The Little Things Give You Away", and "No Roads Left"; acoustic guitar on "The Little Things Give You Away", lead vocals on "In Between", "Hands Held High" and "No Roads Left", rap vocals on "Bleed It Out" and "Hands Held High", backing vocals on "What I've Done", "Shadow of the Day", "No More Sorrow" and "The Little Things Give You Away"
Production
 Rick Rubin – production
 Dana Nielsen – engineering
 Andrew Scheps – engineering
 Ethan Mates – engineering
 Phillip Broussard, Jr. – engineer assisting
 Neal Avron – mixing
 Nicolas Fournier – mix assisting
George Gumbs – mix assisting
 Dave Collins – mastering
 Tom Whalley - A&R
 Ellen Wakayama - creative directing

Guest musicians on "Leave Out All the Rest", "Shadow of the Day", "Hands Held High", "The Little Things Give You Away", and "No Roads Left"
 David Campbell – string arrangements and conducting
 Charlie Bisharat – violin
 Mario DeLeon – violin
 Armen Garabedian – violin
 Julian Hallmark – violin
 Gerry Hilera – violin
 Songa Lee-Kitto – violin
 Natalie Leggett – violin
 Josefina Vergara – violin
 Sara Parkins – violin
 Matt Funes – viola
 Andrew Picken – viola
 Larry Corbett – cello
 Suzie Katayama – cello
 Oscar Hidalgo – bass

Charts

Weekly charts

Year-end charts

Decade-end charts

Certifications and sales

References

Linkin Park albums
Linkin Park video albums
Warner Records albums
Albums produced by Rick Rubin
2007 albums
Albums produced by Mike Shinoda
Concept albums
Albums recorded at The Mansion (recording studio)